Azucena Sanchez Benito (born 15 October 1978) is a road cyclist from Spain. She participated at the 2012 UCI Road World Championships in the Women's team time trial for S.C. Michela Fanini-Rox.

References

External links
 profile at Procyclingstats.com

1978 births
Spanish female cyclists
Living people
Place of birth missing (living people)